This is a list of circuits which hosted an A1 Grand Prix race between 2005–06 and 2008–09.  In total, 20 different circuits hosted A1 Grand Prix rounds. Both the first and final races of the series were held at Brands Hatch, in the United Kingdom.

 
Circuits
A1 Grand Prix